Vincent Albert Martin (February 17, 1870 – September 22, 1951) from Fruitport, Michigan, was a member of the Michigan Senate.

Biography
Martin was born on February 17, 1870, in Dane County, Wisconsin. He was Congregationalist.

Career
Martin was a member of the Senate from 1917 to 1918 and again from 1925 to 1928. He was unsuccessful candidate in the Republican primary for the Senate in 1922 and 1940.

Martin died at his home in Grand Haven, Michigan, at the age of 81.

References

1870 births
1951 deaths
People from Dane County, Wisconsin
Republican Party Michigan state senators
People from Muskegon County, Michigan
20th-century American politicians